Chambers Creek is a stream in the U.S. state of Tennessee.  It is a tributary to the Tennessee River.

Chambers Creek has the name of John Chambers, a pioneer settler.

References

Rivers of Alcorn County, Mississippi
Rivers of Tishomingo County, Mississippi
Rivers of Hardin County, Tennessee
Rivers of McNairy County, Tennessee
Rivers of Mississippi
Rivers of Tennessee